Anna Sigríður Þorvaldsdóttir (Anna Thorvaldsdottir) (born 11 July 1977) is "one of Iceland's most celebrated composers" and 2012 winner of the Nordic Council Music Prize. Her music is frequently performed in Europe and in the United States, and is often influenced by landscapes and nature.

Early life and education
Anna Thorvaldsdottir trained as a cellist in her youth, and began composing at a young age. She studied composition at Iceland Academy of the Arts (BA in Composition), and later attended the University of California, San Diego, gaining her MA and PhD.

Career
Anna Thorvaldsdottir has been commissioned by Berliner Philharmoniker, New York Philharmonic, Los Angeles Philharmonic, Orchestre de Paris, City of Birmingham Symphony Orchestra, Gothenburg Symphony Orchestra, Munich Philharmonic, International Contemporary Ensemble, Ensemble Intercontemporain, BBC Proms, and Carnegie Hall among others.

Portrait concerts of Thorvaldsdottir's work have been presented at many major venues and music festivals, including: Chicago’s Museum of Contemporary Art, Knoxville’s Big Ears Festival, Lincoln Center’s Mostly Mozart Festival in NYC, Münchener Kammerorchester’s Nachtmusic der Moderne series, National Sawdust, the Composer Portraits Series at NYC’s Miller Theatre, the Leading International Composers series at the Phillips Collection in Washington DC, Gothenburg Symphony Orchestra’s Point Festival, and Wigmore Hall.

As an educator, she has given lectures and presentations at Stanford, Columbia, Cornell, NYU, Northwestern, University of Chicago, Sibelius Academy, and the Royal Academy of Music in London.

Thorvaldsdottir is currently composer-in-residence with the Iceland Symphony Orchestra. She is based in Surrey, UK, near London.

Major Orchestral Works

Dreaming 
Dreaming, for which Thorvaldsdottir received the 2012 Nordic Council Music Prize (see below), was premiered by the Iceland Symphony Orchestra and Bernharður Wilkinson on Jan 14 2010. The UK premiere was given by the BBC Symphony Orchestra and Rumon Gamba on Jan 11 2019.

AERIALITY 
AERIALITY was an important work for catapulting Thorvaldsdottir's orchestral writing into the interest of American orchestras. It was commissioned by the Iceland Symphony Orchestra and premiered in November 2011. It was selected as a top 10 recording in 2014 by The New Yorker's Alex Ross, and by John Schaefer for WNYC's New Sounds Year in Review.

METACOSMOS 
The New York Philharmonic's Kravis Emerging Composer Award (see below), and the associated commission of METACOSMOS, premiered on April 4, 2018 under the baton of Esa-Pekka Salonen at Lincoln Center's David Geffen Hall, cemented Thorvaldsdottir's status as “one of the most unique and expressive voices in the compositional scene today.” The European premiere was given by the Berliner Philharmoniker and Alan Gilbert.

AION 
Aiōn, co-commissioned by the Iceland Symphony Orchestra and the Gothenburg Symphony Orchestra, was given its world premiere on May 24, 2019, at the Point Music Festival in the Gothenburg Concert Hall, Gothenburg, by the Gothenburg Symphony Orchestra conducted by Anna-Maria Helsing. It received its US premiere at Spoleto Festival USA in 2022, conducted by John Kennedy.

CATAMORPHOSIS 
CATAMORPHOSIS was premiered by the Berlin Philharmonic and Kirill Petrenko on Jan 29 2021. The work was a Berlin Philharmonic commission (co-commissioned by New York Philharmonic, City of Birmingham Symphony Orchestra, and Iceland Symphony Orchestra). CATAMORPHOSIS also received the UK's Ivors Composer Award for Large Scale Composition in 2021 (see below for other Awards and Honours). The UK premiere of CATAMORPHOSIS was given by the CBSO and Ludovic Morlot.

ARCHORA 
ARCHORA was commissioned by the BBC Proms (co-commissioned by the Los Angeles Philharmonic, Munich Philharmonic, Orchestre de Paris, Klangspuren Schwaz, and Iceland Symphony Orchestra). The work was premiered by the BBC Philharmonic and Eva Ollikainen on August 11 2022 at Royal Albert Hall.

Awards and Honours 

 CATAMORPHOSIS received the UK's Ivors Composer Award for Large Scale Composition in 2021.
 Thorvaldsdottir received the Lincoln Center’s Emerging Artist Award and Martin E. Segal Award, 2018.
 In 2015, she was chosen as the New York Philharmonic's Kravis Emerging Composer, an honor that includes a $50,000 cash prize and a commission to write a composition for the orchestra; she is the second recipient. The orchestra later performed the premiere of her symphonic poem Metacosmos under the conductor Esa-Pekka Salonen in April 2018.
 Anna Thorvaldsdottir was awarded the 2012 Nordic Council Music Prize for her orchestral work Dreaming, one of the pieces on her album Rhízōma which was released on 25 October 2011 on Innova Recordings.

Selected works

Orchestral 

 ARCHORA (2022)
 CATAMORPHOSIS (2020)
 AION (2018)
 METACOSMOS (2017)
 AERIALITY (2011)
 Dreaming (2008)

Chamber 

 Enigma (2019), for string quartet
 Spectra (2017), for violin, viola, and cello
 Illumine (2016), for string octet
 Aequilibria (2014), for large ensemble
 In the Light of Air (2014), for percussion, harp, piano,  viola, cello, harp, and electronics
 Ró (2013), for bass flute, bass clarinet, percussion, piano, two violins, viola, cello
 aura (2011), for percussion trio
 Hrím (2010), for large ensemble

Choral 

 Ad Genua (2016), for choir and string quintet
 Heyr þú oss himnum á (2005)
 Hey mig mín sál (2003)

Selected Recordings 

 Aerial (Sono Luminus, 2022) [Originally released on Deutsche Grammophon in 2014]
 ENIGMA (Sono Luminus, 2021)
 Rhizoma (Sono Luminus, 2020) [Originally released on Innova in 2011]
 AEQUA (Sono Luminus, 2018)
 In the Light of Air (Sono Luminus, 2015)

References

External links

Anna Þorvaldsdóttir's website

1977 births
Anna Thorvaldsdottir
Anna Thorvaldsdottir
Living people
Anna Thorvaldsdottir
21st-century women musicians